The Pocahontas Stakes is a Grade III American Thoroughbred horse race for two-year-old fillies over a distance of  miles on the dirt scheduled annually in September at Churchill Downs in Louisville, Kentucky.

History
The race was first held on Thanksgiving Day, 27 November 1969 and was fittingly named for Pocahontas, the daughter of Native-American chief Powhatan, who aided the early American settlers and the same named Pocahontas, the 19th century British-bred thoroughbred mare, who had a great influence on the  breed.

The stakes race remained as a Thanksgiving Day event until 1982 when it was moved to the early weeks of the Fall Meet.

The event was first classified as Grade III in 2005 and a Grade II race in 2010. In 2020 the event was downgraded back to Grade III.

The distance of the race originated at 7 furlongs and was run at that distance for the first 13 years from 1969 to 1981. The distance was changed to one mile beginning in 1982 and continued at that distance through 2012. In 2013, the distance was increased to  miles. In 2020 the event was decreased back to 1 mile.

The event was split into divisions eight times with the last occurrence in 1983.

The new scheduling allowed the Pocahontas to become a major prep for the Breeders' Cup Juvenile Fillies. It is a "Win and You're In" race in the Breeders' Cup Challenge series.

The Pocahontas is the first step on the annual Road to the Kentucky Oaks, a points system to qualify for the Kentucky Oaks at Churchill Downs in the spring of the following year.

Records
Speed record
  miles:  	1:43.78  – Hidden Connection (2021)
 1 mile: 1:34.57 –  Sara Louise   (2008)
 7 furlongs: 1:22.40  – Fair Ye Well (1970)

Margins
  lengths – Serengeti Empress (2018)

Most wins by a jockey
 7 – Pat Day    (1983 div.1, 1983 div.2, 1984, 1987, 1994, 1995, 2004)

Most wins by a trainer
 3 – Dale L. Romans (2008, 2009, 2014)
 3 – D. Wayne Lukas    (1988, 1994, 2003)
 3 –  Pete Vestal     (1991, 1996, 1997)

Most wins by an owner
 3 – Wilmott Stables    (1991, 1996, 1997)

Winners

Notes:

† Divisions of the event in 1973, 1976 and 1977 were run on different days

§ Ran as part of an entry

See also
 Road to the Kentucky Oaks
 List of American and Canadian Graded races

References

Churchill Downs horse races
Grade 3 stakes races in the United States
Flat horse races for two-year-old fillies
Graded stakes races in the United States
Breeders' Cup Challenge series
Recurring sporting events established in 1969
1969 establishments in Kentucky